Yangosar is a rural locality (a village) in Staroselskoye Rural Settlement, Vologodsky District, Vologda Oblast, Russia. The population was 31 as of 2002.

Geography 
Yangosar is located 44 km southwest of Vologda (the district's administrative centre) by road. Korytovo is the nearest rural locality.

References 

Rural localities in Vologodsky District